Shannon Arrum Williams (born 26 May 1998), known professionally as Shannon, is a British-South Korean singer and voice actress currently based in England. She is known for being a contestant of K-pop Star 6: The Last Chance. Prior to debut, Shannon has released two single: "Day and Night" with T-ara's Areum and Gavy NJ's Gun-ji in September 2012 and then "Remember You" featuring SPEED's Jungkook in January 2014 before making her official debuted in December 2014 with digital single "Daybreak Rain". Since her debut, she has released two extended plays, six singles and three soundtrack appearances. In 2016, Shannon also made her debut as an actress with cast in drama Moorim School: Saga of the Brave.

Early life and pre-debut
Shannon Arrum Williams was born on 26 May 1998 in England to a Welsh father, Williams Lees, and to a Korean mother, Kim Jung-mi. Shannon (Korean name: Kim Arrum) is the youngest child in her family. She has two older twin half-brothers, Christian and Jonah Lees, who are from her father's previous relationship. She attended Sylvia Young Theatre School in London and—at the age of 7—she was given the role of Cosette in the musical Les Misérables. Shannon studied at Dwight School Seoul but dropped out before completion.

Early in her career, Shannon's original training was focused on performing as the main vocalist for an all-girl band. Later, her agency announced that, at her own request, she would be trained as a solo artist instead. She revealed this personally in a magazine interview stating, "I was preparing for a debut as the main vocalist of a girl group, but I had a lot of greed towards singing. I asked my agency to let me debut as a solo artist. I'm grateful that they decided to listen to me and I was able to go solo."

Career

2010–2014: Debut and career beginnings
Shannon first appeared in South Korean media on SBS's Star King in 2010 and gained attention after she displayed her singing  in 2011. Core Contents Media recruited Shannon after seeing it that year.

In 2012, Shannon released a collaboration single, "Day and Night" with Areum (former member of T-ara) and Gun-ji (Gavy NJ) and was also featured in singer Yangpa's song "Together." On 23 November, Shannon appeared an episode of JTBC's Hidden Singer 2 as one of the impersonators of singer IU.

On 8 January 2014, Shannon appeared on JTBC's Hidden Singer 2 for the King of Kings finale round and performed IU's "Good Day" and Beyoncé's "Listen", but was eliminated before the final round. On 29 January, her pre-debut single "Remember You" featuring Speed's Jongkook was released to commemorate the end of her three-year training for her debut. On 12 February, Shannon made an appearance on her labelmate showcase, Speed Day, which aired on SBS MTV. She performed "Let It Go", a song from the film Frozen, and Rihanna's "Diamonds" with Dani. On 1 December, Shannon made her official debut with released digital single titled "Daybreak Rain". The single charted at number 32 on the Gaon digital chart. On 26 December, she, Vasco, and Giriboy released a collaboration single titled "Breath".

2015–2018: Acting debut and K-pop Star 6
On 6 March 2015, Shannon released her EP Eighteen, which consists of seven tracks with the lead single "Why Why". On 10 July 2015, Shannon collaborated with rapper Yuk Ji-dam and released the digital single "Love X Get Off". In September 2015, Shannon was confirmed to star in the KBS drama Moorim School.

On 3 March 2016, Shannon released a single called "Lachrymal Gland", featuring Soheechan as part of the 2gether project.

From 20 November 2016 to 9 April 2017, she took part in the TV reality show K-pop Star 6: The Last Chance. The prize was a contract that would grant the winner promotions from YG, JYP and Antenna Music. Shannon received high praise for her technical singing ability but was critiqued for her lack of emotion. She was selected into YG's group and sang songs such as "Man in the Mirror", "Who's Your Mama", "Happy", and "Ain't No Other Man". She advanced to the top 4 (semi-finals) before she was eliminated.

Shannon released her digital single "Love Don't Hurt" on 26 June 2017. The single contains two versions: a Korean version (featuring Lil' Boi) and an English version featuring f(x)'s Amber.
Her second EP, Hello, released on 28 July with five tracks, including the accompanying title track of the same name and the previously released single "Love Don't Hurt". Shannon held her comeback showcase at the Yes24 Muv Hall on 27 July, one day before the album's release;
she performed on Music Bank the next day. The music video for "Hello" was released on 31 July.

On 24 June 2018, Shannon released her third digital single "Hatred Farewell".

2019–present: departure from MBK
In the first half of 2019, Shannon announced she would leave MBK following the expiration of her contract in the same year.

In October 2019, Shannon was confirmed to cast in the musical We Will Rock You, as Scaramouche, which will be held in December 2019.

Discography

Extended plays

Singles

Collaborations and soundtracks

Concert
 Shannon First Live Concert (2014)

Filmography

Video games

Television series

Theatre

Videography

Music videos

Awards and nominations

Golden Disc Awards

|-
| rowspan="3" | 2015
| rowspan="3" | Shannon
| Rookie of the Year
| 
|-
| Popularity Award
| 
|-
| Global Popularity Award
|

Mnet Asian Music Awards 

|-
| rowspan="2" | 2014
| rowspan="2" | Shannon
| Best New Female Artist
| 
|-
| Artist of the Year
|

Seoul Music Awards

|-
| rowspan="4" | 2015
| rowspan="4" | Shannon
| Rookie of the Year
| 
|-
| Bonsang Award
| 
|-
| K-Wave Popularity Award
| 
|-
| Hallyu Special Award
|

References

External links

1998 births
Living people
K-pop singers
MBK Entertainment artists
South Korean women pop singers
Singers from London
South Korean female idols
British expatriates in South Korea
English people of Welsh descent
English people of Korean descent
Alumni of the Sylvia Young Theatre School
K-pop Star participants
21st-century British women singers
21st-century South Korean women singers